Symphytum grandiflorum, the creeping comfrey, or running comfrey is a species of flowering plant in the family Boraginaceae. It is native to the Caucasus region, and introduced to various locales in Europe as a garden escapee. A deer-tolerant perennial, it is hardy in USDA zones 5 through 8, and is recommended for borders and shady situations. The unimproved species and a number of cultivars are commercially available, including 'Goldsmith', 'Hidcote Blue' and 'Hidcote Pink'.

References

grandiflorum
Flora of the Caucasus
Plants described in 1846